Stackify LLC is an American software company based in Leawood, Kansas. It was founded in January 2012 by Matt Watson,  an American entrepreneur.  Stackify assists software developers in troubleshooting and provides support with a suite of tools including Prefix and Retrace. Stackify claims that typical APM software is insufficient in managing application code and that its own APM software includes detailed insights for developers, checking code for errors in real time and analyzing applications for performance problems.

In January 2019, Stackify raised $2.74 million in convertible debt financing from undisclosed investors. In November 2019, the company raised $6 million from Cypress Growth Capital, the Mid-America Angels investment network, along with local angel investors.

References

External links 
 

American companies established in 2012
Software companies based in Kansas
Privately held companies based in Kansas
Defunct software companies of the United States
Website monitoring software